Peter Maloney may refer to:

 Peter Maloney (politician), Canadian politician
 Peter Maloney (actor) (born 1944), American actor
 Peter Maloney (cricketer) (born 1950), Australian cricketer

See also
Peter Maloni (born 1964), Australian rules footballer